The 2012 All-Ireland Senior Ladies' Football Championship Final featured  and . Kerry were playing in their first All-Ireland final since 1993. This was the first time Kerry lost an All-Ireland final. Meanwhile Cork maintained their unbeaten record in All-Ireland finals. At half-time Cork led by 0–10 to 0–3.

Route to the Final

Match info

Teams

References

 
All-Ireland Senior Ladies' Football Championship Finals
Cork county ladies' football team matches
Kerry county ladies' football team matches
All-Ireland